Kenneth Bruce Smith (born October 19, 1926) is an American former politician in the state of Florida.

Smith was born in Alabama and came to Florida in 1951. He attended Florida State University and was a newspaper publisher. Thomas served in the Florida House of Representatives from 1961 to 1970, as a Democrat, representing Taylor County.

References

1926 births
Living people
Democratic Party members of the Florida House of Representatives
People from Clanton, Alabama
People from Taylor County, Florida
Florida State University alumni